Pueyrredón is a station on Line B of the Buenos Aires Underground.  Passengers may transfer from here to the Corrientes Station on Line H. The station was opened on 17 October 1930 as part of the inaugural section of the line between Federico Lacroze and Callao.

It is located in the Balvanera barrio, at the intersection of Avenida Corrientes and Avenida Pueyrredón, and named after the latter.

References

External links

Buenos Aires Underground stations
Balvanera
Railway stations opened in 1931
1931 establishments in Argentina